Syndrome is a 2012 South Korean medical drama series, starring Han Hye-jin, Song Chang-eui and Park Gun-hyung. It is set in the world of neurosurgery where a medical student finds herself in a love triangle with two fellow doctors. The television series aired on JTBC from February 13 to April 17, 2012 on Mondays and Tuesdays at 21:55 (KST) time slot for 20 episodes.

Synopsis
Lee Hae-jo (Han Hye-jin) is a first year resident specializing in neurosurgery. She didn't graduate from a premier medical school, but she is determined to become the best neurosurgeon. Cha Yeo-wook (Song Chang-eui) is also a first year neurosurgery resident. Unlike Hae-jo, Cha Yeo-wook graduated from the best medical school and is the grandson of the chairman of the board at the Korea University Hospital. His background to become a doctor is impeccable. Kang Eun-hyun (Park Gun-hyung) is the chief resident of neurosurgery. A love triangle begins between these three people.

Cast
 Han Hye-jin as Lee Hae-jo
 Song Chang-eui as Cha Yeo-wook
 Park Gun-hyung as Kang Eun-hyun 
 Jo Jae-hyun as Cha Tae-jin
 Kim Sung-ryung as Oh Eun-hee 	
 Kim Yu-seok as Min Sung-joon
 Im Byung-gi as Lee Gyu-jo (Hae-jo's father)
 Im Won-hee as Oh Gwang-hee
 Um Hyo-sup as Park Sun-woo
 Yoon Ji-min as Kim Yi-joon
 Jang Sung-won as Heo Jo-kang
 Kim Dong-hyeon as Lee Jae-yoon
 Baek Ok-dam as Ko Ah-reum
 Cha Min-ji as Min-jee

International broadcast

References

External links
  
 
 

JTBC television dramas
Korean-language television shows
2012 South Korean television series debuts
2012 South Korean television series endings
South Korean medical television series
South Korean romance television series
Television series by IWill Media